The 43rd edition of the Vuelta a Colombia was held from March 20 to April 4, 1993. There were a total number of 102 competitors, including 26 foreign riders. The race started in Ecuador.

Stages

1993-03-20: Tulcán (Ecuador) — Ipiales (11.5 km)

1993-03-21: Tulcán (Ecuador) — Pasto (95.4 km)

1993-03-22: Pasto — El Bordo (165.8 km)

1993-03-23: Popayán — Palmira (153.5 km)

1993-03-24: Cali — Pereira (219.2 km)

1993-03-25: Santa Rosa de Cabal — Medellín (202.5 km)

1993-03-26: Itagüí — Manizales (188.5 km)

1993-03-27: Manizales — Ibagué (216.6 km)

1993-03-28: Ibagué — Bogotá (212.6 km)

1993-03-29: Sopó — Duitama (176.3 km)

1993-03-30: Tunja — San Gil (191.8 km)

1993-03-31: San Gil — Bucaramanga (100.2 km)

1993-04-01: Bucaramanga — Pamplona (129 km)

1993-04-02: Pamplona — San Cristóbal (126 km)

1993-04-03: Cúcuta — Chinácota (40.4 km)

1993-04-04: Circuito Cúcuta (120.9 km)

Final classification

Teams 

Pony Malta-Avianca

Alemania-Ahusan (Hessen)

Kelme-Pony Malta-Xacobeo

Gaseosas Glacial Profesional PRF

Lotería de Medellín-AA

Cadafé

Manzana Postobón

Agua Natural Glacial

Carchi Ecuador

Pinturas Rust Oleum

Lotería de Nariño

Pilsener Ecuador

References 
 pedalesybielas (Archived 2009-10-21)

Vuelta a Colombia
Colombia
Vuelta Colombia